Milcombe is a hamlet in the parish of Pelynt in Cornwall, England. Milcombe is in the valley of the West Looe River south of Sowden's Bridge and east of Muchlarnick.

References

Hamlets in Cornwall